The 1930–1931 SM-Sarja Season was played in cup-format with 5 teams from 3 cities participating.

First round

TaPa and Riento through to Semifinals.

Semifinals

TaPa and HJK to Final.

Final

Tampereen Palloilijat wins the 1930–31 Finnish ice hockey championship.

References
 Hockey Archives

Liiga seasons
1930–31 in Finnish ice hockey
Fin